The 2012–13 season will be Debreceni VSC's 35th competitive season, 20th consecutive season in the OTP Bank Liga and 110th year in existence as a football club.

First team squad

Transfers

Summer

In:

Out:

Winter

In:

Out:

List of Hungarian football transfers summer 2012
List of Hungarian football transfers winter 2012–13

Competitions

Super Cup

Nemzeti Bajnokság I

Classification

Results summary

Results by round

Matches

Hungarian Cup

League Cup

Group stage

Classification

Knockout phase

Champions League

The First and Second Qualifying Round draws took place at UEFA headquarters in Nyon, Switzerland on 25 June 2012.

Europa League

Statistics

Appearances and goals
Last updated on 2 June 2013.

|-
|colspan="14"|Youth players:

|-
|colspan="14"|Players out to loan:
|-

|-
|colspan="14"|Players no longer at the club:
|-

|}

Top scorers
Includes all competitive matches. The list is sorted by shirt number when total goals are equal.

Last updated on 2 June 2013

Disciplinary record
Includes all competitive matches. Players with 1 card or more included only.

Last updated on 2 June 2013

Overall
{|class="wikitable"
|-
|Games played || 51 (30 OTP Bank Liga, 6 UEFA CL and EL, 7 Hungarian Cup and 8 Hungarian League Cup)
|-
|Games won || 25 (14 OTP Bank Liga, 1 UEFA CL and EL, 6 Hungarian Cup and 4 Hungarian League Cup)
|-
|Games drawn || 6 (4 OTP Bank Liga, 1 UEFA CL and EL, 0 Hungarian Cup and 1 Hungarian League Cup)
|-
|Games lost || 20 (12 OTP Bank Liga, 4 UEFA CL and EL, 1 Hungarian Cup and 3 Hungarian League Cup)
|-
|Goals scored || 89
|-
|Goals conceded || 60
|-
|Goal difference || +29
|-
|Yellow cards || 94
|-
|Red cards || 9
|-
|rowspan="1"|Worst discipline ||  Mihály Korhut (11 , 1 )
|-
|rowspan="1"|Best result || 8–0 (H) v Létavértes SC - Hungarian Cup - 06-02-2013
|-
|rowspan="2"|Worst result || 0–3 (H) v Club Brugge K.V. - UEFA Europa League - 23-08-2012
|-
| 1–4 (A) v Club Brugge K.V. - UEFA Europa League - 30-08-2012
|-
|rowspan="1"|Most appearances ||  Adamo Coulibaly (40 appearances)
|-
|rowspan="1"|Top scorer ||  Adamo Coulibaly (27 goals)
|-
|Points || 81/153 (52.94%)
|-

References

External links
 Eufo
 Official Website 
 UEFA
 fixtures and results

Debreceni VSC seasons
Debrecen